Akot is a city in the Vidarbha Region that is the district headquarters of the Akola district in the Indian state of Maharashtra.

Geography
It has an average elevation of 345 metres (1132  feet).

Demographics
According to the 2011 Indian census, Akot had a population of 92,637. Males constitute 52% of the population and females 48%. Akot has an average literacy rate of 70.8%, which is higher than the national average of 59.5%; 74.8% of the males and 66.6% of the females are literate. 15% of the population is under 6 years of age.

References

Cities and towns in Akola district
Talukas in Maharashtra